The western tentiform leafminer (Phyllonorycter elmaella) is a moth of the family Gracillariidae. It is known from British Columbia in Canada and California, Oregon, Washington and Utah in the United States.

The wingspan is about 6 mm. Adults are golden brown with white bands or spots.

The larvae feed on Crataegus species, Malus species (including Malus communis, Malus domestica, Malus pumila and Malus sylvestris) and Prunus avium. They mine the leaves of their host plant. They feed on cells between the upper and lower epidermal layers.

References

External links
Fact Sheet
Bug Guide

elmaella
Moths of North America
Moths described in 1980